Julee is a given name. Notable people with the name include:

Julee Cerda (born 1978), American actress
Julee Cruise (1956–2022), American singer and songwriter
Julee Rosso, American cook and food writer

See also
Julie (given name)